Enulius flavitorques, the  Pacific longtail snake,  is a species of snake of the family Colubridae. The species is found in Mexico, Guatemala, Honduras, El Salvador, Nicaragua, Costa Rica, Panama, Venezuela, and Colombia.

References

Enulius
Reptiles of Mexico
Reptiles of Honduras
Reptiles described in 1868
Taxa named by Edward Drinker Cope